The following is a list of high schools in Albuquerque, New Mexico.

References

 
Albuquerque